The Zhangping–Longchuan railway, also known as the Zhanglong railway, is a railway linking Zhangping, Fujian Province, and Longchuan County, Guangdong, in southeastern China.

Line description
The Zhangping–Longchuan railway consists of the following railways:

 The Zhangping–Longyan–Kanshi railway or Zhanglongkan railway,  in length, between Zhangping and Kanshi in Fujian. The Zhanglongkan railway itself consists of the Zhangping–Longyan and the Longyan–Kanshi railways.  
The Zhangping–Longyan railway, also called the Zhanglong railway,  in length, was built from 1958 to 1961 as a spur off the Yingtan–Xiamen railway to transport coal from southwestern Fujian.  This line should not be confused for the Zhangping–Longchuan railway, of which it is a constituent section.
The Longyan–Kanshi railway or Longkan railway,  in length, was built from 1970 to 1972, to extend the Zhangping–Longyan railway to Kanshi in Yongding County, Fujian.
 The Meizhou–Kanshi railway or Meikan railway,  in length, between Meizhou, Guangdong and Kanshi, Fujian, completed in 1999 and began operation in September 2000.  The Meikan railway was the first rail link between the two provinces. 
 The Longchuan to Meizhou section of the Guangzhou–Meizhou–Shantou railway,  in length, between Longchuan, Guangdong and Kanshi, Fujian, completed in 1995.

Rail connections
 Zhangping: Yingtan–Xiamen railway, Zhangping–Quanzhou–Xiaocuo railway
 Longyan: Longyan–Xiamen railway, Ganzhou–Longyan railway
 Longchuan: Guangzhou–Meizhou–Shantou railway

See also

 List of railways in China

References

Railway lines in China
Rail transport in Fujian
Rail transport in Guangdong
Longyan